The 112th Street Bridge is a bridge that carries New York State Route 470 across the Hudson River in New York. It connects Van Schaick Island in the city of Cohoes with the Lansingburgh neighborhood of Troy. The original bridge was built in 1922 and demolished in 1995. The newer version was completed in 1996.

See also
List of fixed crossings of the Hudson River

References

External links

Bridges over the Hudson River
Bridges completed in 1922
Bridges completed in 1996
Bridges in Albany County, New York
Bridges in Rensselaer County, New York
Road bridges in New York City